Taliparamba (Perimchellur) is an area that is part of Kannur district of Kerala state, south India.

Major educational organizations 

National Institute of Fashion Technology Kannur
Government College of Engineering, Kannur
 Vimal Jyothi Engineering College, Chemperi
 Sir Syed College
 Tagore Vidyaniketan Higher Secondary School, Taliparamba
 Taliparamba Arts and Science College

Other schools and colleges
 Bharatiya Vidya Bhavan, Taliparamba
 National College, Taliparamba
 Moothedath High School, Taliparamba
 Chinmaya Vidyalaya, Taliparamba
 Seethi Sahib Higher Secondary School

See also 
 Taliparamba

References 

Taliparamba
Taliparamba
Taliparamba